Classic Bites is a compilation album released in 2002 by the German hard rock/heavy metal band Scorpions. It features songs from two studio albums—Crazy World (1990) and Face the Heat (1993)—as well as a single track from the 1995 live album Live Bites.

Reception

Greg Prato of AllMusic criticises the compilation, claiming that it "falls very short" as it "focuses entirely on their early-'90s period... and nothing earlier". He suggests that Bad for Good: The Very Best of Scorpions is "a much more thorough collection".

Track listing

Personnel
 Klaus Meine – lead vocals, whistling on "Wind of Change"
 Matthias Jabs – lead guitar, acoustic guitar on "Send Me an Angel", backing vocals
 Rudolf Schenker – rhythm guitar, lead guitar, backing vocals
 Francis Buchholz – bass, backing vocals (tracks 1, 3, 6, 9, 11-13, 15-17)
 Ralph Rieckermann – bass, backing vocals (tracks 2, 4-5, 7-8, 10, 14)
 Herman Rarebell – drums, percussion, backing vocals

References

Albums produced by Keith Olsen
Mercury Records compilation albums
Scorpions (band) compilation albums
2002 compilation albums